Distorted Humor (foaled March 19, 1993 in Kentucky) is an American Thoroughbred racehorse and a successful sire.

Bloodline

Distorted Humor's sire is Forty Niner, 1987's Eclipse Award winning Outstanding Two-Year-Old Male Horse by the champion sire, Mr. Prospector.  Distorted Humor's dam was Danzig's Beauty by Danzig.  Distorted Humor was her second foal.  (Danzig's Beauty died June 17, 2006, at the age of 19 due to colic.  She'd given birth in April 2006, to her last foal, a filly by Empire Maker.  Of her eight starters, six were winners.)

Racing career

Distorted Humor himself had a career running middle-distance stakes races.  He broke his maiden at Florida's Gulfstream Park and was initially trained by Phil Gleaves as a sprinter/miler. Elliott Walden took over training duties in the spring of 1996 after Prestonwood Farm purchased a half-interest in Distorted Humor. Distorted Humor's career race record was 8 wins, 5 places and 3 shows in 23 starts, with earnings of $769,964.  As a three-year-old, he won the Screen King Stakes, was second in the Grade III Fayette Stakes and the Grade II Jerome Handicap, and finished 3rd in the Grade III King's Bishop Stakes.  At four, he took the Grade III Salvator Mile Handicap, and was second in the Grade III Kentucky Cup Classic Stakes and the Grade III Philip H. Iselin Handicap.  At five, he took the Grade II Commonwealth Breeders' Cup Stakes (setting the record for the distance that still holds), the Grade II Churchill Downs Stakes, and the Grade III Ack Ack Handicap before he was retired.

At maturity, he reached .

Success as a sire

Beginning in 1999, Distorted Humor stood twice in Victoria, Australia, (at Grand Lodge Stud in Avenel) for $12,000.  He sired two Australian crops.  In those crops, 93 foals were runners, 74 were winners, 12 placed, and two others have come in the money.  His get include Rinky Dink: winner of the South Australian Oaks and the Tasmanian Oaks, Distorted Halo: winner of the Moonee Valley and Mercedes-Benz Hong Kong Derby Trial, and Tirade: winner of the Caulfield Guineas Prelude and third in VRC Ascot Vale Stakes.  Among his Australian winners are both flat runners and jumpers.  One jumper, four-year-old Some Are Bent, took the Moonee Valley Hurdle in July 2006, his third jumps win in his past four outings.

Back in the United States, Distorted Humor's 2000 fee remained low and his mares average, yet he became America's leading freshman sire of 2002. In 2003, his son Funny Cide became a dual classic winner, and Awesome Humor was a Grade I winner.

In 2005, Distorted Humor's oldest foals were five-year-olds. Over the course of 140 races, 88 of his get (13 of which were two-year-olds) earned $8.6 million.  He finished the year as the second top sire in America, beaten only by the now deceased Saint Ballado.  By late 2006, he had 255 winners, including 18 graded stakes winners, from 340 starters and sired 46 stakes winners.  From five crops, his progeny have earned $30,265,433.  In 2006, as a 14-year-old sire, he had 20 different horses win a combined 31 stakes races, 10 of which were graded.

At age 15 (2008), Distorted Humor produced at least 20 stakes winners for the second year in a row.  For the third straight year, he ranked among the top six stallions by progeny earnings.  For 2007, he ranked third behind Smart Strike (sire of Curlin and English Channel) and A.P. Indy. 2011 was his best year yet as he earned the title of Leading sire in North America, thanks in part to Belmont Stakes winner Drosselmeyer.

"Distorted Humor's progeny inherit the will to win, the desire; a lot like Storm Cat," said WinStar Farm President and CEO Doug Cauthen.  "They're always battling.  They battle and win or try to win, and that desire tends to get them in the winner's circle."

Progeny record

Currently standing at WinStar Farm in Versailles, Kentucky, Distorted Humor has produced progeny that include:

Grade I winners
 Funny Cide, 2003 Kentucky Derby, 2003 Preakness, 2004 Jockey Club Gold Cup
 Drosselmeyer, 2010 Belmont Stakes, 2011 Breeders' Cup Classic
 Flower Alley, 2005 Travers Stakes, 2005 Lane's End Stakes, 2005 Jim Dandy Stakes, Sire of I'll Have Another
 Hystericalady, 2006 Hollywood Breeders' Cup Oaks, 2007 Humana Distaff Handicap, 2007 & 2008 Molly Pitcher Breeders' Cup Handicap, 2008 Azeri Stakes, Fleur de Lis Handicap 2008, Delaware Handicap 2008
 Commentator, 2005/2008 Whitney Handicap, 2008 Richter Scale Breeders' Cup Sprint Championship Handicap, 2008 Massachusetts Handicap
 Awesome Humor, 2002 Spinaway Stakes
 Any Given Saturday, 2007 Dwyer Stakes, 2007 Haskell Invitational Handicap, 2007 Brooklyn Handicap
 Rinky Dink, 2004 Australasian Oaks
 Boisterous, 2013 Man O' War Stakes
 Cursory Glance, 2014 Moyglare Stud Stakes
 Bit of Whimsy, 2007 Queen Elizabeth II Challenge Cup Stakes, 2007 Mrs. Revere Stakes
 Restless Rider, 2018 Darley Alcibiades
 Santin, 2022 Turf Classic Stakes, Arlington Million

Grade II & III winners
 Go Rockin' Robin, 2003 Peter Pan Stakes
 Cowtown Cat, 2007 Illinois Derby, 2007 Gotham Stakes
 Da Stoops, 2005 California Breeders' Champion Stakes, 2006 California Cup Sprint, 2006 Sunshine Millions Dash
 Original Spin, 2005 Arlington-Washington Breeders' Cup Lassie Stakes Grade III
 Sensibly Chic, 2005 Vagrancy Handicap
 Sharp Humor, 2006 Swale Stakes
 Forty Niners Son, 2007 San Luis Rey Handicap
 It's No Joke, 2006 Bet on Sunshine Handicap at Churchill Downs, 2006 Grade II Hawthorne Gold Cup Handicap, 2006 Grade III Ack Ack Handicap
 Change Up, 2006 Pocahontas Stakes
 Z Humor, finished first in a dead heat with Turf War in the 2007 running of the Delta Jackpot Stakes
 Regal Ransom, 2009 UAE Derby, Super Derby
 Justenuffhumor, 2009 Bernard Baruch Handicap
 Endorsement, 2010 Sunland Derby
 Alternation, 2011 Peter Pan Stakes
 Machen, 2011 Derby Trial Stakes
 Brethren, 2011 Sam F. Davis Stakes
 Alternation, 2012 Oaklawn Handicap, 2012 Pimlico Special
 Ironicus, 2015 Bernard Baruch Handicap (Grade II), setting new track record at Saratoga

Fees

Distorted Humor's fee for 2008 was $300,000—the same fee commanded by A.P. Indy and Storm Cat. Due to the uncertain financial climate beginning in 2008, his fee was reduced to $225,000 for 2009 and $100,000 for 2011. In 2017 his fee was listed by WinStar and Bloodhorse.com as $80,000.

Pedigree

References

Distorted Humor's racing stats
Distorted Humor Profile at Winstar Farm LLC
Distorted Humor Profile on the Stallion Register
 Blood Horse leading sire list
WinStar Farm
 NTRA bio of WinStar Farm
National Thoroughbred Racing Association's bio of WinStar

1993 racehorse births
Racehorses bred in Kentucky
Racehorses trained in the United States
United States Champion Thoroughbred Sires
Thoroughbred family 9-f